Ingvil Smines Tybring-Gjedde (born 8 July 1965) is a Norwegian politician for the Progress Party. She served as State Secretary at the Ministry of Petroleum and Energy from 2015 to 2019, and minister of public security from 2019 until the Progress Party withdrew from government in 2020.

Career

Minister of Public Security
After the Christian Democratic Party joined the Solberg Cabineg on 22 January 2019, Tybring-Gjedde was appointed Minister of Public Security in the Ministry of Justice and Public Security.

Personal life
She is married to politician Christian Tybring-Gjedde, with whom she has four children.

References

1965 births
Living people
Norwegian politicians
Progress Party (Norway) politicians
Female interior ministers
Women government ministers of Norway